The Women's discus throw competition at the 1968 Summer Olympics in Mexico City, Mexico took place on October 18.

Competition format
The competition consisted of a single final round. Each athlete is allowed three throws, with the top eight athletes after that point being given three further attempts.

Records
Prior to the competition, the existing World and Olympic records were as follows.

Results

References

External links
 Official Olympic Report, la84foundation.org. Retrieved August 16, 2012.

Athletics at the 1968 Summer Olympics
Discus throw at the Olympics
1968 in women's athletics
Women's events at the 1968 Summer Olympics